Santiago de Méndez Canton is a canton of Ecuador, located in the Morona-Santiago Province.  Its capital is the town of Santiago.  Its population at the 2001 census was 9,841.

References

Cantons of Morona-Santiago Province